Admirals of Germany have existed since the founding of German sea forces, first with the Reichsflotte and then most predominantly that of the Prussian Navy.  German admirals led the German Navy through World War I, as leaders of the Imperial German Navy, as well as through the inter-war years of the Reichsmarine.

Flag officers of the Kriegsmarine were the leadership of the Germany Navy during World War II under the authority of Nazi Germany.  The modern day Germany Navy exists after the navies of Germany being separated into the West German Navy and the Volksmarine of East Germany.

Großadmirale

The rank of Grossadmiral (Grand admiral) was introduced in 1905 as the naval equivalent to the five-star rank of the Generalfeldmarschall (general field marshal) OF-10 in Heer (en: Army). Hans von Koester was the first German flag officer to hold this rank. Wilhelm II. would wear the uniform of a Großadmiral on occasions. Since as Emperor he was Commander-in-Chief of the Navy and thus not subject to promotions.

Generaladmirale

Admirale

The rank of admiral was the highest rank until the rank of Großadmiral was introduced in 1905. Prince Adalbert of Prussia was the first and only admiral of the Prussian Navy and later the Navy of the North German Confederation. The rank was not used in the Imperial German Navy until 1892. In the Reichsmarine Admiral was again the highest of three flag officer ranks. With the creation of the Kriegsmarine and the expansion of the fleet a new rank, Generaladmiral, was introduced in 1936, followed by the rank of Großadmiral in 1939. Thus the rank of admiral became the third-lowest, roughly equivalent of a general in the Heer or Luftwaffe. When the Bundeswehr was formed in 1955 Admiral became the highest rank again. The Volksmarine of the National People's Army of the German Democratic Republic used ranks similar to those in the Soviet Navy. While technically there was a rank of Flottenadmiral (Fleet Admiral), Admiral was the highest rank any naval officer achieved.

Vizeadmirale

Vizeadmiral was a flag officer rank introduced in the Prussian Navy in 1858 and used subsequently in all other German navies.

Vizeadmirale (Charakter)

Konteradmirale

Konteradmiral (Rear Admiral) has been a flag officer rank in the naval forces of Germany since 1849.

Konteradmirale (Charakter)

Flottillenadmirale

The rank of Flottillenadmiral (Rear Admiral, lower half) was newly established in 1955 as the naval equivalent to Brigadegeneral. The rank roughly corresponds to the position of Kommodore in earlier German naval forces.

 
Lists of German military personnel
Germany